The inventive step and non-obviousness reflect a general patentability requirement present in most patent laws, according to which an invention should be sufficiently inventive—i.e., non-obvious—in order to be patented. In other words, "[the] nonobviousness principle asks whether the invention is an adequate distance beyond or above the state of the art".

The expression "inventive step" is predominantly used in Europe, while the expression "non-obviousness" is predominantly used in United States patent law. The expression "inventiveness" is sometimes used as well. Although the basic principle is roughly the same, the assessment of the inventive step and non-obviousness varies from one country to another. For instance, the practice of the European Patent Office (EPO) differs from the practice in the United Kingdom.

Rationale 
The purpose of the inventive step, or non-obviousness, requirement is to avoid granting patents for inventions which only follow from "normal product design and development", to achieve a proper balance between the incentive provided by the patent system, namely encouraging innovation, and its social cost, namely conferring temporary monopolies. The non-obviousness bar is thus a measure of what society accepts as a valuable discovery. Additional reasons for the non-obviousness requirement are providing incentives for fundamental research rather than for "incremental improvements", and minimizing the "proliferation of economically insignificant patents that are expensive to search and to license".

According to the inducement theory, "if an idea is so obvious that people in the field would develop it without much effort, then the incentives provided by the patent system may be unnecessary to generate the idea". Thus, there is a need "to develop some means of weeding out those inventions which would not be disclosed or devised but for the inducement of a patent." Merges and Duffy regret that "the inducement standard was not influential in the legal doctrine, and its absence from subsequent case law raises one of the great unanswered questions of patent law: How can courts continue to ignore a seemingly reasonable and theoretically solid approach to determining patentability?"

Controversies and alternatives 

While trying to weed out the "easy" inventions, the non-obviousness requirement brings in several downsides to the overall patent system, particularly in the pharmaceutical field, which depends on patent protection most heavily. For example,

Although all countries with actively functional patent systems currently have a requirement for inventive step,  the need for such a doctrine has been questioned. For example, "substantial novelty" has been proposed as an alternative approach. Also, many countries have, in addition to patents, utility models, which have a lower (or none) requirement for non-obviousness in return for a shorter monopoly term duration. The availability of utility model protection minimizes for inventors, developers and manufacturers the risk associated with the uncertainty of non-obviousness analysis (litigation) outcome (see below).

In the US, there is no gradation stronger inventive step - longer patent duration, and all-or-nothing approach is used. Under such a system, drawing the line between inventive(all) and obvious (nothing) is ambiguous, as numerous lawsuits with changing outcomes on appeal illustrate (e.g. Sanofi-Aventis GmbH v. Glenmark Pharmaceuticals, 748 F. 3d 1354 (Fed. Circuit 2014)).  Also, unique to the United States is the possibility to introduce as the evidence of non/obviousness facts, discovered after filing the patent application in question. (e.g. Knoll Pharm. Co. v Teva Pharm. USA, Inc. 367 F.3d 1381, 1385(Fed. Circ.2004) and  Genetics Inst., LLC v. Novartis Vaccines & Diagnostics, Inc. 655 F.3d 1291, 1307 (Fed.Circ.2011), In re Khelgatian 53 CCPA 1441, 364 F.2d 870, 876 (1966)).

Although the need for low bar of inventiveness has been well acknowledged, the proposed means of actually measuring such a bar have all been rather unsuccessful despite 200 years of case law history. "A standard that is clear and easy to apply consistently will mark where the non-obviousness bar exactly rests, providing society as a whole, and lawmakers in particular, with a benchmark to gauge the patent system's efficacy. Moreover, such a standard will allow the lower courts to determine non-obviousness correctly and consistently, at least hypothetically reducing uncertainty, inducing uniformity, and lowering reversal odds." Mr. Cecil D. Quillen Jr., Senior Advisor to Putnam, Hayes and Bartlett, Inc., and former General Counsel to the Eastman-Kodak Company, concurs: "The PTO should apply the same standard followed in the courts so that patentees receive a patent that is worthy of respect rather than merely an invitation to the roulette wheel of litigation." The US Supreme Court, however, has criticised the patent agency for failing to follow the same standards as the courts:
[I]t must be remembered that the primary responsibility for sifting out unpatentable material lies in the Patent Office. To await litigation is, for all practical purposes, to debilitate the patent system. We have observed a notorious difference between the standards applied by the Patent Office and by the courts. While many reasons can be adduced to explain the discrepancy, one may well be the free rein often exercised by Examiners in their use of the concept of "invention".

Jurisdictions

Canada 

The requirement for non-obviousness is codified under section 28.3 of the Patent Act (R.S.C., 1985, c. P-4).

The Supreme Court of Canada affirmed the test for non-obviousness laid out in Windsurfing International Inc. v. Tabur Marine (Great Britain) Ltd. in Apotex Inc. v. Sanofi‑Synthelabo Canada Inc.:

 Identify the notional "person skilled in the art" and identify the relevant common general knowledge of that person;
 Identify the inventive concept of the claim in question or if that cannot readily be done, construe it;
 Identify what, if any, differences exist between the matter cited as forming part of the "state of the art" and the inventive concept of the claim or the claim as construed;
 Viewed without any knowledge of the alleged invention as claimed, do those differences constitute steps which would have been obvious to the person skilled in the art or do they require any degree of invention?

Canadian courts also recognize the equivalents of the US objective indicia, i.e. Factors That Support Patentability of an Invention :
Long felt but unsatisfied need for the invention while the needed implementing arts and elements had long been available; 
Appreciation that a problem existed and what the problem was were previously unseen by those skilled in the art;
Substantial attempts by those skilled in the art to fill the need of (1) or the cope with difficulties arising from the failure to understand the problem of (2);
Commercial success of the invention causally related to the invention itself rather than to factors such as advertising or attractive packaging;
Replacement in the industry of the prior art devices by the patented invention;
Prompt copying of the patentee's invention by competitors;
Acquiescence by the industry to the patent's validity by honouring the patent through taking licenses or not infringing the patent, or both:
The existence of prior art or knowledge teaching away from the technical direction taken by the patentee;
Unexpectedness of the results of the invention to those skilled in the art; and 
Disbelief and incredulity on the part of those skilled in the art that the patentee's approach worked.

European Patent Convention (EPC) 

Pursuant to Article 52(1) in conjunction with Article 56, first sentence, EPC, European patents shall be granted for inventions which, among other things, involve an inventive step, that is, the invention, having regard to the state of the art, must not be obvious to a person skilled in the art.

The Examining Divisions, the Opposition Divisions, and the Boards of Appeal of the EPO almost always apply the "problem-solution approach" in order to assess and decide whether an invention involves an inventive step. The approach consists in:

 identifying the closest prior art, the most relevant prior art, or at least a realistic starting point;
 determining the objective technical problem, that is, determining, in the view of the closest prior art, the technical problem which the claimed invention addresses and successfully solves; and
 examining whether or not the claimed solution to the objective technical problem is obvious for the skilled person in view of the state of the art in general.

This last step is conducted according to the "could-would approach". Pursuant to this approach, the question to address in order to assess whether the invention involves an inventive step is the following (the question is the climax of the problem-solution approach):

Is there any teaching in the prior art, as a whole, that would, not simply could, have prompted the skilled person, faced with the objective technical problem formulated when considering the technical features not disclosed by the closest prior art, to modify or adapt said closest prior art while taking account of that teaching [the teaching of the prior art, not just the teaching of the closest prior art], thereby arriving at something falling within the terms of the claims, and thus achieving what the invention achieves?

If the skilled person would have been prompted to modify the closest prior art in such a way as to arrive at something falling within the terms of the claims, then the invention does not involve an inventive step.

The point is not whether the skilled person could have arrived at the invention by adapting or modifying the closest prior art, but whether he would have done so because the prior art would have incited him to do so in the hope of solving the objective technical problem or in expectation of some improvement or advantage. This must have been the case for the skilled person before the filing or priority date valid for the claim under examination.

United Kingdom 
The fundamental test for assessing whether there is an inventive step remains the statutory test: Actavis v Novartis [2010] EWCA Civ 82 at [17]. That test is as follows: an invention shall be taken to involve an inventive step if it is 'not obvious' to 'a person skilled in the art', having regard to any matter which forms part of the 'state of the art' by virtue of section 2(2): s 3 Patents Act 1977.

Courts of the United Kingdom have adopted a general framework to assist in approaching (not answering) the fundamental statutory test. It is known as the Windsurfing or Pozzoli test.

In Windsurfing International Inc. v Tabur Marine (GB) Ltd. [1985] RPC 59 the Court of Appeal suggested the following framework:

 Identify the inventive concept embodied in the patent;
 Impute to a normally skilled but unimaginative addressee what was common general knowledge in the art at the priority date;
 Identify the differences (if any) between the matter cited and the alleged invention; and
 Decide whether those differences (viewed without any knowledge of the alleged invention) constituted steps which would have been 'obvious' to the skilled man, or whether they required any degree of invention.

This test has been slightly reworked in the more recent Court of Appeal case Pozzoli Spa v BDMO SA & Anor [2007] EWCA Civ 588 (22 June 2007):

 (a) Identify the notional "person skilled in the art", (b) Identify the relevant common general knowledge of that person;
 Identify the inventive concept of the claim in question or if that cannot readily be done, construe it;
 Identify what, if any, differences exist between the matter cited as forming part of the "state of the art" and the inventive concept of the claim or the claim as construed;
 Viewed without any knowledge of the alleged invention as claimed, do those differences constitute steps which would have been obvious to the person skilled in the art or do they require any degree of invention?

In Schlumberger Holdings Ltd versus Electromagnetic Geoservices AS [2010] EWCA Civ 819 (28 July 2010), the Court of Appeal clarified that the fictional skilled addressee (which may be a skilled team) used for determining inventive step can vary from the one used for determining claim construction or sufficiency.

United States 

"Non-obviousness" is the term used in US patent law to describe one of the requirements that an invention must meet to qualify for patentability, codified in 35 U.S.C. §103 in 1952. One of the main requirements of patentability in the U.S. is that the invention being patented is not obvious, meaning that a "person having ordinary skill in the art" (PHOSITA) would not know how to solve the problem at which the invention is directed by using exactly the same mechanism. Since the PHOSITA standard turned to be too ambiguous in practice, the U.S. Supreme Court provided later two more useful approaches which currently control the practical analysis of non-obviousness by patent examiners and courts: Graham et al. v. John Deere Co. of Kansas City et al., 383 U.S. 1 (1966) gives guidelines of what is "non-obvious", and KSR v. Teleflex (2006) gives guidelines of what is "obvious".

See also 
 Priority right
 Cripps question

References

Further reading 
 
 G. Knesch, Assessing Inventive Step in Examination and Opposition Proceedings in the EPO, epi Information 3/1994, pp. 95–101.

External links 
 European Patent Convention
 
 
  ("Inventive step")
 Could-would approach
  ("Could-would approach") and Technical Board of Appeal decision T2/83 of 15 March 1984.

Patent law